Agustín Alberto Manga Magro (born 21 May 1980 in Granollers, Spain) is a Spanish footballer who plays as a midfielder.

External links

Gavà unofficial profile 

1980 births
Living people
Footballers from Granollers
Spanish footballers
Association football midfielders
Segunda División players
Segunda División B players
Tercera División players
FC Barcelona C players
FC Barcelona Atlètic players
FC Cartagena footballers
CE Mataró players
CF Gavà players
Girona FC players
CE Sabadell FC footballers
CF Badalona players
CE L'Hospitalet players
FC Santboià players
Palamós CF footballers
UE Vilassar de Mar players
Spain youth international footballers